{{DISPLAYTITLE:Iodine (131 I) derlotuximab biotin}}

Iodine (131 I) derlotuximab biotin is a monoclonal antibody designed for the treatment of recurrent glioblastoma multiforme.

This drug was developed by Peregrine Pharmaceuticals, Inc.

References 

Experimental cancer drugs
Monoclonal antibodies for tumors
Antibody-drug conjugates
Iodine compounds
Radiopharmaceuticals